An exorcist is a person who is believed to be able to cast out the devil or other demons. This list consists of notable people who have been known or been publicly recognized as performing exorcisms.

Catholic exorcists

 Candido Amantini (1914–1992)
 Gabriele Amorth (1925–2016)
 Raymond J. Bishop (1906–1978)
 William S. Bowdern (1897–1983)
 Jeremy Davies (1935–2022)
 Joseph de Tonquedec (1868–1962)
 Thomas J. Euteneuer (1962)
 Angelo Fantoni (1903–1992)
 Pope John Paul II (1920–2005)
 José Antonio Fortea (1968)
 Walter Halloran (1921–2005)
 Edward Hughes (1918–1980)
 Lawrence Kenny (1896–1977)
 James J. LeBar (1936–2008)
 Malachi Martin (1921–1999)
 Emmanuel Milingo (1930)
 Pio of Pietrelcina (1887–1968)
 Theophilus Riesinger (1868–1941)
 Peter Heier (1895–1982)
 Peter Mary Rookey (1916–2014)
 Vince Lampert
 Chad Ripperger

Orthodox exorcists

 Avvákum Petróv (1621–1682)

Anglican exorcists

 Christopher Neil-Smith  (1920–1995)
 Bill Subritzky

Lutheran exorcists

 Johann Blumhardt (1805–1880)

Baptist, Evangelical, and Pentecostal exorcists

 Brian Connor (Baptist)
 Charles H. Kraft (Evangelical) (1932)
 Bob Larson (Evangelical)
 Edir Macedo (Pentecostal) (1945)
 Derek Prince (Pentecostal)
 Frank Hammond (Baptist) (1921–2005)

Nondenominational Christian exorcists

 Brother Carlos Oliveira (1989–present)

References